Mocek is a surname. Notable people with the surname include:

Gregory Mocek (born 1962), American government official
Petr Mocek (born 1980), Czech ice hockey player
Sławomir Mocek (born 1976), Polish fencer